Don Manuel García Escobar MML (19 October 1931 – 24 October 2013), better known as Manolo Escobar, was a Spanish singer of Andalusian copla and other Spanish music. He was also an actor and performed in multiple musicals. His popular songs include "El porompompero" (1962), "Mi carro" (1969), "La minifalda", and "Y viva España".

Biography
Manuel García Escobar was born to Antonio García and María del Carmen Escobar on 19 October 1931, the fifth of ten children. Early in Escobar's life, his father left the family tradition of farming to devote himself to hospitality and culture. Antonio then met a retired teacher who had lost his family in the Spanish Civil War. Antonio gave the teacher room and board in exchange for teaching all of his children music. Escobar started playing the flute and the piano in his early years.

When he was 14, he moved from Almería to Barcelona with his brothers, working as an apprentice in various trades. He began his career in show business between Badalona and Barcelona's red-light district (currently known as El Raval), with the group Manolo Escobar y sus guitarras (Manolo Escobar and his guitars). His brothers Salvador and Baldomero were also in the group. Later, when the group started to become successful, Juan Gabriel, another brother, joined. Juan Gabriel and sister, Maria José, would later write songs for the group.

In 1962, he rose to fame with Canciones del Maestro Solano, his debut in Madrid and Barcelona, and the premiere of the movie filmed in the town of Arcos de la Frontera (Cádiz): Los Guerrilleros.

Even after 1965, when the copla genre's popularity was in decline, Escobar topped record sales lists, and was one of the few artists who had his own company and show.

In the early 1990s, he moved into his "Porompompero" chalet in Benidorm, named after his acclaimed song. He appeared in more than 20 films and recorded almost 80 albums, 24 of which are gold records He also had a platinum selling cassette. His best-selling album was Y viva España, which sold 6 million (10 million in subsequent official reprints) copies. It was the best-selling album in Spain from 1973 to 1992.

Personal life

In 1959, three months after meeting German-born Anita Marx, Escobar married her. They were married in Cologne, Germany, without knowing how to speak each other's language and remained married for 53 years until his death. They adopted a daughter a few years later and named her Vanessa. She was only 3 days old at the time. The song "Mi pequeña flor" (My little flower) is dedicated to her.

Death
Manuel García Escobar died of colon cancer on 24 October 2013, at the age of 82.

Discography
 Espigas y Amapolas (1964) 
 El ángel de la guarda (1966)
 Éxitos de películas (1967)
 Aquel hijo (1967)
 Películas de Manolo Escobar (1968)
 Mi novia (1968)
 Villancicos (1969)
 Manolo Escobar y sus películas (1970)
 Canciones de películas (1970)
 Aires navideños (1970)
 Sevillanas (1971)
 Grandes éxitos (1971)
 Brindis (1971) "incluye 'Mi carro'"
 Por los caminos de España (1972)
 Y viva España (1973)
 Cada lágrima tuya (1974)
 ¡Ay, Caridad! (1974)
 Qué guapa estás (1975)
 Niña bonita (1976)
 Selección Antológica del Cancionero Español Vol. I, II y III (1976–1977)
 Calor (1977)
 Labrador (1978)
 Mis mejores canciones (1978)
 Mi pequeña flor (1979)
 Amores (1980)
 Villancicos tradicionales (1981) 
 Manolo, siempre Manolo (1981)
 Los grandes pasodobles... cantados (1982)
 Papá te quiero mucho (1982)
 Coraje (1983)
 Sevilla casi na (1984)
 Miel de Amores (1985)
 Antología (1986)
 Vive la vida (1986)
 Suspiros de España (1987)
 30 aniversario (1988)
 Por pasodobles, por sevillanas (1989)
 Rumba pa ti (1990)
 ¡Qué bonita eres! (1991)
 Tango, tango (1992)
 El Clio en llamas (1993)
 Tiempo al tiempo (1994)
 Tiempo de Navidad (1995)
 Con mi acento (1996)
 Aromas (1997)
 Contemporáneo (1999)
 Grandes éxitos (1999) 
 De puerto en puerto (2000)
 Manolo Escobar (2002)

Filmography

Honours 
 Silver Medal of Merit in Labour (Spain, 30 April 1969).
 Gold Medal of Merit in Labour (Spain, 29 April 2011).

References

External links

 
 
 
 

1931 births
2013 deaths
Deaths from colorectal cancer
People from the Province of Almería
Singers from Andalusia
Spanish male singers
Deaths from cancer in Spain
Spanish male musical theatre actors
Male actors from Andalusia
Spanish male film actors
Spanish Roman Catholics